Halofuginone, sold under the brand name Halocur, is a coccidiostat used in veterinary medicine. It is a synthetic halogenated derivative of febrifugine, a natural quinazolinone alkaloid which can be found in the Chinese herb Dichroa febrifuga (Chang Shan).  Collgard Biopharmaceuticals is developing halofuginone for the treatment of scleroderma and it has received orphan drug designation from the U.S. Food and Drug Administration.

Halofuginone inhibits the development of T helper 17 cells, immune cells that play an important role in autoimmune disease, but it does not affect other kinds of T cells which are involved in normal immune function. Halofuginone therefore has potential for the treatment of autoimmune disorders.

Halofuginone is also an inhibitor of collagen type I gene expression and as a consequence it may inhibit tumor cell growth.  Halofuginone exerts its effects by acting as a high affinity inhibitor of the enzyme glutamyl-prolyl tRNA synthetase. Inhibition of prolyl tRNA charging leads to the accumulation of uncharged prolyl tRNAs, which serve as a signal to initiate the amino acid starvation response, which in turn exerts anti-inflammatory and anti-fibrotic effects.

References 

Antiparasitic agents
Bromoarenes
Chloroarenes
Piperidines
Secondary alcohols
Quinazolinones
Lactams